Kron Moore (pronounced Kay-Ren) is an American actress and singer. She is known for her role as First Lady Victoria Franklin in the BET prime time soap opera The Oval and Bridget Chapel in Stargirl.

Life and career
Moore was born and raised in Detroit, Michigan. She began performing in school plays, but later pursued her career in music, performing in a number of R&B and soul bands before a solo career. She released her debut album in 2002, but it was not a commercial success. She attended the University of Alabama where she earned a bachelor's degree in Psychology.

As an actress, Moore played small roles in films Into the Storm (2014) and The SpongeBob Movie: Sponge Out of Water (2015). On television, she appeared in Tyler Perry's The Haves and the Have Nots and Too Close to Home, before in 2019 he cast Moore in his prime time soap opera The Oval. She plays manipulative First Lady of the United States Victoria Franklin opposite Ed Quinn. Moore also has a recurring role as Bridget Chapel in the DC Universe series Stargirl in 2020. In 2022, she co-starred opposite Amber Riley in the Lifetime thriller Single Black Female.

Filmography

Film

Television

References

External links

21st-century American actresses
African-American actresses
American television actresses
Living people
University of Alabama alumni
Actresses from Detroit
1975 births
21st-century African-American women
21st-century African-American people
20th-century African-American people
20th-century African-American women